The Satakunta dyke swarms are a series of dyke swarms of Mesoproterozoic age in the Bothnian Sea and western and central Finland.

Föglö dyke swarm

Häme dyke swarm

Satakunta-Ulvö dyke swarm
The dyke swarm has been considered to be a result of a failed rift in the Bothnian Sea that developed as part of an extensional tectonic setting within the supercontinent of Columbia. At various location dykes of the swarm cut across Jotnian sediments indicating a Postjotnian age for the dyke swarm. Viewed in a map the dyke swarm has the form of a 90-degrees fan radiating open to the east from a point in the Bothnian Sea.

See also
Gothian orogeny
Kattsund-Koster dyke swarm

References

Dike swarms 
Mesoproterozoic magmatism
Geology of Finland
Geology of Sweden